Ted Smith (born July 15, 1945) is the founder and former executive director of the Silicon Valley Toxics Coalition, co-founder of the International Campaign for Responsible Technology, and chair of the Electronics TakeBack Coalition steering committee.

Smith is a former VISTA Volunteer, a 1967 graduate of Wesleyan University, and a 1972 graduate of Stanford Law School.

In 2001, Smith was recognized by the Dalai Lama for his environmental leadership  and in 2006 he co-edited the book, Challenging the Chip: Labor Rights and Environmental Justice in the Global Electronics Industry.

References

External links
 Ted Smith: Pioneer activist for environmental justice in Silicon Valley, 1967-2000, oral history transcript, Bancroft Library, University of California Berkeley
 Interview with Ted Smith
 American Public Health Association presentation on "Challenging the Chip", November 07, 2006
 Ted Smith: Purpose Prize Fellow
 Environmentalism for the Net 2.0
 Where the Chips Fall: Environmental Health in the Semiconductor Industry
The Cleaning Agent

American environmental lawyers
Living people
American non-fiction environmental writers
Wesleyan University alumni
Stanford Law School alumni
1945 births